Cameron Marshall (born October 14, 1991) is a Canadian football running back who is currently a free agent. He played college football at Arizona State. Marshall has also spent time with the Miami Dolphins, Winnipeg Blue Bombers, Seattle Seahawks, Jacksonville Jaguars, Saskatchewan Roughriders, and Hamilton Tiger-Cats.

Early years
Cameron Marshall was born to Greg and Tammie Marshall and has an older sister, Dahlys, and younger brother, Byron. Marshall attended Valley Christian High School in San Jose, California where he graduated in 2009.

College career
Marshall verbally committed to the Arizona State on January 27, 2009. Marshall played all four years with the Sun Devils, playing in 49 games over that span. Marshall scored 38 rushing touchdowns, amassed 2,700 rushing yards with an average of 4.7 yards per carry.

Professional career

Miami Dolphins
On April 27, 2013, after going undrafted, Marshall announced on Twitter he would sign with the Miami Dolphins. On August 8, 2013, Marshall was waived due to a lingering hamstring injury from the month prior. The following day, August 9, he reverted to the Dolphins' injured reserve list. On August 14, 2013, Marshall was released with an injury settlement by the Dolphins. On November 26, 2013, Marshall was re-signed to the Dolphins' practice squad. On December 31, 2013, Marshall was signed to a futures contract with the Dolphins. On May 28, 2014, Marshall was waived from the roster to make room for Anthony Gaitor. On August 11, 2014, Marshall was signed by the Dolphins before being released a week later on the 18th.

Winnipeg Blue Bombers
On October 21, 2014, Marshall was signed by the Winnipeg Blue Bombers of the Canadian Football League (CFL). In two seasons Marshall played in 19 games for the Blue Bombers totaling 1,007 yards and 7 touchdowns on 175 touches.

Seattle Seahawks
On February 11, 2016, Marshall was signed by the Seattle Seahawks. On May 4, 2016, the Seahawks waived Marshall.

Jacksonville Jaguars
On August 23, 2016, Marshall was signed by the Jacksonville Jaguars. On August 29, 2016, he was waived by the Jaguars.

Saskatchewan Roughriders
On February 16, 2017, Marshall was signed by the Saskatchewan Roughriders of the Canadian Football League (CFL). In his first season with the club Marshall carried the ball 101 times for 543 yards with two touchdowns. He also caught 30 passes for 280 yards and another two touchdowns. On May 10, 2018 the Riders announced they had released Marshall. Marshall was re-signed by the Riders on August 14, 2018. Marshall played only three games for the Riders in 2018, rushing 34 times for 220 yards. He was not re-signed by the team following the season and became a free agent on February 12, 2019.

Hamilton Tiger-Cats 
On February 27, 2019 Marshall agreed to a contract with the Hamilton Tiger-Cats (CFL).

References

External links
Seattle Seahawks bio
Winnipeg Blue Bombers bio
Arizona State Sun Devils bio

1991 births
Living people
American football running backs
Canadian football running backs
American players of Canadian football
Arizona State Sun Devils football players
Miami Dolphins players
Winnipeg Blue Bombers players
Seattle Seahawks players
Jacksonville Jaguars players
Saskatchewan Roughriders players
Players of American football from San Jose, California
Players of Canadian football from San Jose, California
Hamilton Tiger-Cats players